The 2011 ICC World Cricket League Americas Region Twenty20 Division Two was a cricket tournament that took place between 9–13 April 2011. Suriname hosted the event.

Teams
The teams that qualified automatically were as follows:

The team that qualified for winning the 2011 ICC Americas Twenty20 Division Three was as follows:

Fixtures

Points Table

Matches

Statistics

Most runs
The top five highest run scorers (total runs) are included in this table.

Most wickets
The following table contains the five leading wicket-takers.

See also

2012 ICC World Twenty20 Qualifier

References

2012 ICC World Twenty20